The 1929 Ole Miss Rebels baseball team represented the University of Mississippi in the 1929 NCAA baseball season. The team was coached by Pete Shields, and claimed a SoCon championship.

References

Southern Conference baseball champion seasons
Ole Miss Rebels baseball seasons